Doubs is a commune in the Doubs department in the Bourgogne-Franche-Comté region in eastern France. It lies on the river Doubs, adjacent to the north of Pontarlier.

Population

See also
 Communes of the Doubs department

References

Communes of Doubs